A cassolette (from the diminutive form of the French word cassole, a small container) is a small porcelain, glass, or metal container used for the cooking and serving of individual dishes. The word also refers to dishes served in such a container:

 Cassolettes ambassadrice: A ragoût of chicken livers with a duchesse potato border.
 Cassolettes bouquetière: creamed vegetables topped with asparagus tips and cauliflower florets.
 Cassolettes marquise: Crayfish tails à la Nantua to which diced truffles and mushrooms have been added with a border of puff pastry.
 Cassolettes Régence: a salpicon of chicken breast and truffles in a velouté sauce, topped with asparagus tips with a border of duchesse potatoes.

It may also refer to a box or vase with a perforated cover to emit perfumes and hence the natural scent of a woman.

See also
 List of cooking vessels
 Cassoulet
 Casserole

References
 Larousse Gastronomique (1961),  Crown Publishers (translated from the French, Librairie Larousse, Paris (1938))
 Dictionnaire de l'Académie française, 9 édition.
 Elizabeth David, French Country Cooking, decorated by John Minton, published by John Lehmann (1951)

Notes

Cooking vessels
Serving vessels
French cuisine